Rigatoni con la pajata (Romanesco dialect; standard Italian rigatoni con la pagliata ) is a classic dish of the Roman cuisine. The dish can be found in some traditional trattorias in Rome. Pajata is the term for the intestines of an unweaned calf, i.e., only fed on its mother's milk. The intestines are cleaned and skinned, but the chyme is left inside. Then the intestine is cut in pieces 20–25 cm long, which are bound together with white thread, forming rings. When cooked, the combination of heat and the enzyme rennet in the intestines coagulates the chyme and creates a sort of thick, creamy, cheese-like sauce. These rings can be served simply seasoned and grilled (pajata arrosto) or in the traditional Roman dish in which pajata is stewed in a typical tomato sauce and served with rigatoni.

See also

References

Bibliography

Pasta dishes
Offal
Cuisine of Lazio